Los Angeles airport shooting may refer to:

2002 Los Angeles International Airport shooting, which killed two people
2013 Los Angeles International Airport shooting, which killed a TSA officer